Marco Savioni (born February 23, 1931 in Milan) is an Italian former footballer who played as a midfielder. He made nearly 200 appearances in Serie A.

References

1931 births
Living people
Italian footballers
Association football midfielders
Casale F.B.C. players
Inter Milan players
Novara F.C. players
U.S. Alessandria Calcio 1912 players
Calcio Lecco 1912 players
F.C. Pavia players
Serie A players
Serie B players
Serie D players